Graham Hurst (born 22 September 1960) is a former English cricketer.  Hurst was a right-handed batsman.  He was born in Newcastle-upon-Tyne, Northumberland.

Hurst made his debut for Durham against the Lancashire in the 1979 Minor Counties Championship.  He played Minor counties cricket for Durham from 1979 to 1987, making 53 Minor Counties Championship appearances and 7 MCCA Knockout Trophy appearances.  He made his List A debut against Surrey in the 1982 NatWest Trophy.  He made 3 further List A appearances, the last of which came against Warwickshire in the 1986 NatWest Trophy.  He struggled against first-class opponents in his 4 List A matches, scoring just 14 runs at an average of 4.66, with a high score of 7.

References

External links
Graham Hurst at ESPNcricinfo
Graham Hurst at CricketArchive

1960 births
Living people
Cricketers from Newcastle upon Tyne
English cricketers
Durham cricketers